Pâquerette is a ballet in three acts, with choreography by Arthur Saint-Léon and music by François Benoist.

The ballet was first presented by the Ballet of the Académie Royale de Musique on January 15, 1851 in Paris, France, with Fanny Cerrito as Pâquerette and Arthur Saint-Léon as François.

Revivals/Restagings
Restaging by Arthur Saint-Léon for the Imperial Ballet, with Cesare Pugni making additions and revising Benoist's score. First presented on January 28/February 9 (Julian/Gregorian calendar dates), 1860 at the Imperial Bolshoi Kamenny Theatre, in St. Petersburg, Russia.
Revival by Marius Petipa for the Imperial Ballet, with Léon Minkus making additions and revising Benoist's score. First presented on January 10–22, 1882 at the Imperial Bolshoi Kamenny Theatre, in St. Petersburg, Russia. Eugenia Sokolova (as Pâquerette), and Pavel Gerdt (as François).
In 2012, an hourlong duet titled Pâquerette was performed at the Invisible Dog Art Center as part of the Queer New York Festival with two nude performers.

References

See also
 List of ballets by title

Ballets by François Benoist
Ballets by Cesare Pugni
Ballets by Arthur Saint-Léon
Ballets by Marius Petipa
1851 ballet premieres
Ballets premiered at the Paris Opera Ballet